Zhong Huandi (born 28 June 1967 in Yunnan) is a retired Chinese long-distance runner who concentrated on the 3000 and 10,000 metres, and later the marathon. She became a four-time Asian champion and two-time World Championships silver medalist.  On 8 September 1993, she became the second fastest 10,000 meter runner of all time, only surpassed by Wang Junxia, the winner of that same race by more than half a lap in what remained the world record until the 2016 Olympics.  Both runners surpassed the standing world record by Ingrid Kristiansen.

International competitions

See also
China at the World Championships in Athletics

External links
 
 

1967 births
Living people
Runners from Yunnan
Chinese female long-distance runners
Chinese female marathon runners
Olympic athletes of China
Athletes (track and field) at the 1988 Summer Olympics
Athletes (track and field) at the 1992 Summer Olympics
Asian Games gold medalists for China
Asian Games medalists in athletics (track and field)
Athletes (track and field) at the 1990 Asian Games
Athletes (track and field) at the 1994 Asian Games
Medalists at the 1990 Asian Games
Medalists at the 1994 Asian Games
Universiade silver medalists for China
Universiade medalists in athletics (track and field)
Medalists at the 1987 Summer Universiade
World Athletics Championships athletes for China
World Athletics Championships medalists
Japan Championships in Athletics winners